Sam Taylor (born 5 May 1999) is a professional Australian rules footballer playing for the Greater Western Sydney Giants in the Australian Football League (AFL). He is a tall defender. Taylor made his debut in round 11 of the 2018 season against the Adelaide Crows at Adelaide Oval.

Originally from Bullsbrook, Western Australia, Taylor's parents are Susan and Graham. He is the third of the family's seven children and was educated at Guildford Grammar School. He played at colts level for Swan Districts in the West Australian Football League (WAFL) in 2016 and the first half of 2017 before transitioning to league level. He is a graduate of the AFL Academy and played in the AFL Under 18 Championships for Western Australia, receiving All-Australian honours. He was drafted by the GWS Giants with pick 28 in the 2017 national draft.

Statistics
Updated to the end of 2022.

|-
| 2018 
|  || 15 || 8 || 0 || 0 || 32 || 39 || 71 || 16 || 24 || 0.0 || 0.0 || 4.0 || 4.9 || 8.9 || 2.0 || 3.0 || 0 
|-
| 2019 
|  || 15 || 22 || 1 || 0 || 115 || 121 || 236 || 84 || 36 || 0.1 || 0.0 || 5.2 || 5.5 || 10.7 || 3.8 || 1.6 || 0 
|-
| 2020 
|  || 15 || 4 || 0 || 1 || 10 || 22 || 32 || 11 || 10 || 0.0 || 0.3 || 2.5 || 5.5 || 8.0 || 2.8 || 2.5 || 0
|-
| 2021 
|  || 15 || 19 || 0 || 0 || 164 || 109 || 273 || 116 || 39 || 0.0 || 0.0 || 8.6 || 5.7 || 14.4 || 6.1 || 2.1 || 0
|-
| 2022 
|  || 15 || 22 || 0 || 0 || 190 || 145 || 335 || 132 || 59 || 0.0 || 0.0 || 8.6 || 6.6 || 15.2 || 6.0 || 2.7 || 1
|-
|- class=sortbottom
! colspan=3 | Career
! 75 !! 1 !! 1 !! 511 !! 436 !! 947 !! 359 !! 168 !! 0.0 !! 0.0 !! 6.8 !! 5.8 !! 12.6 !! 4.8 !! 2.2 !! 1
|}

Notes

Honours and achievements
Individual
 All-Australian team: 2022

References

External links 
 
 

Living people
1999 births
Swan Districts Football Club players
Australian rules footballers from Western Australia
Greater Western Sydney Giants players